Yorkville Records was a Canadian record label formed in 1966. The label, which itself was a subsidiary of the larger Arc Records, was founded by Arc Records president Phil Anderson originally under the name Yorktown Records. Initially, the record label almost exclusively distributed recordings by the garage rock band the Ugly Ducklings, which resulted in a string of national hits, including "Nothin'", "10:30 Train", and "She Ain't No Use to Me".

When Yorktown migrated to Yorkville Records in late 1966, the company signed more musical artists, first earning a minor hit with the Stitch of Tyme's cover of "Got to Get You into My Life". Yorkville Records is considered the only record company established in Canada to dedicate its efforts specifically on material rooted in the musical genre of psychedelic rock, releasing additional records by the Quiet Jungle, the Sugar Shoppe, and Willapuss, among others. Additionally, Yorkville released several compilation albums such as Yorkville Evolution and After Four. The label remained active until 1971.

Music historian Piers A. Hemmingsen attributed the collectibility of Yorkville's catalogue to "The bright colours of the label and the unique collection of artists make this a label that record collectors love".

Artists
 Barbra Amesbury
 Brutus
 Ronnie Hawkins
 Heat Exchange
 Ocean
 The Quiet Jungle
 The Sugar Shoppe
 The Ugly Ducklings

References

Defunct record labels of Canada
1966 establishments in Canada
1971 disestablishments